Maarkedal is a municipality located in the Belgian province of East Flanders. In 2021, Maarkedal had a total population of 6,362. The total area is 45.63 km2.

References

External links

Official website 

 
Municipalities of East Flanders